Kamper is a surname. Notable people with the surname include:

Ana María Kámper, Colombian dancer, artist and actress of stage, screen and television
Gerard Kamper (born 1950), Dutch cyclist
John H. Kamper (1857–1933), member of the Wisconsin State Assembly
Jonas Kamper (born 1983), Danish footballer
Louis Kamper (1861–1953), American architect
Olívia Kamper (born 1985), Hungarian handballer
Steve Kamper, Australian politician

See also
Kamper Bas, a hill and a neighborhood at Gokstad in Sandefjord, Norway
Camper (disambiguation)

References